is a Nippon Professional Baseball pitcher.

External links

Living people
1983 births
Baseball people from Saitama (city)
Japanese baseball players
Nippon Professional Baseball pitchers
Saitama Seibu Lions players